People Like Us: Original Motion Picture Soundtrack is the soundtrack to Alex Kurtzman's 2012 film of the same name. It is composed by Academy Award-winning composer A.R. Rahman whose last successful international release was 127 Hours. Rahman began recording the patch work of score in 2011 and the score was completed by late September 2011. The Original Motion Picture Soundtrack was released on June 19, 2012, under the label Lakeshore Records.

Background 
In an interview, Rahman stated his desire to score for an intense emotional American film which got completed through this film. He added that the score was challenging for him as the script emphasized affectionate feels between a family specifically on sibling relations. It was necessary that the score must neither sound romantic nor put people into too much negative emotions since mild and minimal sound arrangements were present. Rahman introduced deliberate nuanced imperfections in the score, like all the imperfections that the characters have in the film and yet having a lot of beauty and hope in it. The soundtrack includes an end credits theme song named "Dotted Line" sung by Liz Phair who had co-written the song with the composer. The song highlights the music composer's rich orchestral score with the singer's acoustic guitar strums, mostly. Phair, keeping the script and three main characters in mind, penned the lyrics partially in just one night after listening to the base score "Dotted Line". She stated the song as lullabying with repetitive word 'Na Na' since the song brings out missing sort of feelings in lives of characters which was to be recreated in the movie.

Track list

Personnel 
Credits adapted from A. R. Rahman's official website.

 Personnel
 Violins : Bruce Dukov, Charlie Bisharat, Belinda Broughton, Darius Campo, Julie Ann Gigante, Tamara Hatwan, Ana Landauer, Natalie Leggett, Dimitrie Leivici, Phillip Levy, Maya Magub, Helen Nightengale, Alyssa Park, Katia Popov, Neil Samples, Jeanne Skrocki, Lisa M. Sutton, Josefina Vergara, Shalini Vijayan, Miwako Watanabe
 Violas: Brian Dembow, Robert Brophy, Andrew Duckles, Alma Fernandez, Keith Greene, Shawn Mann, Darrin McCann, David Walther
 Bass: Michael Valerio, Nico Abondolo, Carmine, Timothy Lefebvre, Edward Meares
 Flute: David Shostac, Heather Clark
 Cello: Steve Erdody, Erika Duke-Kirpatrick, Dennis Karmazyn, Armen Ksajikian, Timothy Landauer, Dana Little, Andrew Shulman
 Clarinets: Stuart Clark, Donald Foster
 Horns: James Thatcher, Daniel Kelly, Jenny Kim
 Percussions: Alan Estes, Michael Shapiro, Donald Williams
 Keyboard: Randy Kerber
 Guitars: George Doering, Michael Ripoll, Thom Rotella, Joel Shearer
 Harp: Jo Ann Turovsky
 Accordion: Guy Allen Klucevsek, Michael Watta
 Harmonica: Jimmie Wood
 Glass armonica: William Zeitler

 Production
 Producer: A. R. Rahman
 Mastering: 
 Additional arrangement: Kazimir Boyle
 Sound engineers: 
 Music editor: Erich Stratmann
 Orchestrator: Matt Dunkley
 Music Contractor: Peter Rotter
 Mixing: Alan Meyerson
 DreamWorks Music Executive: Jennifer Hawks
 DreamWorks Music Co-ordinators: Tori Fillat, Christopher Hogenson
 Music Supervisor: Liza Richardson
 Music Clearance: Julie Sessing
 Soundtrack album executive producers: Skip Williamson, Brian McNelis
 Director of A&R: Eric Craig

References 

2012 soundtrack albums
Experimental music soundtracks
Ambient soundtracks
A. R. Rahman soundtracks
Lakeshore Records soundtracks